The Nizhnekamsk Hydroelectric Station (Russian: Нижнекамская ГЭС), also known as Lower Kama, is a dam and hydroelectric power station on the lower Kama River near Naberezhnye Chelny in Russia. The purpose of the dam is power production, navigation and water supply. It powers a 1,248 MW station with 16 x 78 MW Kaplan turbine-generators. Work on this dam began in 1963 and was not completed until 1990. Work on the reservoir is still done to help maintain it.

See also

Votkinsk Hydroelectric Station

References

Hydroelectric power stations built in the Soviet Union
Hydroelectric power stations in Russia
Dams in Russia
Dams completed in 1963
Dams on the Kama River